Black Hammock Island is an island located in the Northside area of Jacksonville, Florida, in the United States. The island is surrounded by marsh, and is almost directly adjacent to the Timucuan Ecological and Historic Preserve. Cedar Point, operated by the National Park Service, is located at the south end of Black Hammock Island .

References

External links
Official website

Geography of Jacksonville, Florida
Islands of Duval County, Florida
Islands of Florida
Northside, Jacksonville